Thomas Stanton (1806 or 1807 - 24 March 1875) was the Archdeacon of Wilts from 1868 until 1874.

From Somerset, he was educated at Christ's College, Cambridge. After a curacy at Buckhurst Hill, he was Rector of Holy Trinity Shaftesbury from 1846 to 1852; and of All Saints, Burbage  from then until 1874. He was appointed Canon of Sarum in 1859.

He died on 24 March 1875.

References

1806 births
Alumni of Christ's College, Cambridge
Archdeacons of Wilts
1875 deaths